Arder is an Estonian surname. Notable people with the surname include:

Jaan Arder (1952–2014), Estonian singer
Ott Arder (1950–2004), Estonian poet, writer, and translator

See also
Arden (name)

Estonian-language surnames